2007 Nadeshiko League Cup Final was the 5th final of the Nadeshiko League Cup competition. The final was played at Saitama Stadium 2002 in Saitama on September 24, 2007. Nippon TV Beleza won the championship.

Overview
Nippon TV Beleza won their 1st title, by defeating Urawa Reds Ladies 2–1 with Yuki Nagasato and Yukari Kinga goal.

Match details

See also
2007 Nadeshiko League Cup

References

Nadeshiko League Cup
2007 in Japanese women's football